Mustafa Gonden (born 1 August 1975) is a Turkish former professional footballer who played as a midfielder.

Club career
He played mainly for Turkish football clubs, as well as for Bucheon SK of the South Korean between July 2002 and July 2003,  making a total of 7 appearances.

After retirement
He is running Mustafa Gönden Professional Football Academy.

Honours
Gençlerbirliği
 Turkish Cup: 2000–01

References

Enternal links
 

1975 births
Living people
Turkish footballers
Association football midfielders
Turkish expatriate footballers
Turkish expatriate sportspeople in South Korea
Expatriate footballers in South Korea
K League 1 players
Jeju United FC players